Davis Family House, also known as the Davis-Forbes House, is a historic home located near Crabtree, Haywood County, North Carolina. It was built about 1880, and is a -story, two-room plan frame dwelling sheathed in weatherboard.  It was expanded by a shed-room addition in 1925–1926. The front facade features a one-story hip-roof porch.

It was listed on the National Register of Historic Places in 1996.

References

Houses on the National Register of Historic Places in North Carolina
Houses completed in 1880
Houses in Haywood County, North Carolina
National Register of Historic Places in Haywood County, North Carolina
1880 establishments in North Carolina